Hsu Yuan-lin (born 3 June 1971) is a Taiwanese judoka. She competed in the women's half-heavyweight event at the 2000 Summer Olympics.

References

1971 births
Living people
Taiwanese female judoka
Olympic judoka of Taiwan
Judoka at the 2000 Summer Olympics
Place of birth missing (living people)